Khāṣi (or Khaashi) is an Indo-Aryan dialect of Jammu and Kashmir, India. It belongs to the Western Pahari group and is spoken in some of the mountainous areas north of Jammu.

Its area extends on both sides of the river Chenab: to the north this includes the Panj Gabbar region comprising the five valleys of Arnās–Bamhāg, Gool, Gulābgaṛh, Māhore and Budhal. To the south of the Chenab, it is spoken in the Bamhāg-Pancheri block, as well as a number of villages between Arnas and Dubli Gali. Its language neighbours are Kashmiri to the north, Sarazi to the east, Dogri to the south, and Pahari to the west.

The total number of speakers is unknown, but is likely that a substantial proportion of the census figures for "Pahari" in these districts represent speakers of Khāṣi.

References

Bibliography 

Languages of Jammu and Kashmir
Indo-Aryan languages